Mt. Juliet (also referred to as Mount Juliet) is a city located in western Wilson County, Tennessee. Mt. Juliet is located mostly between two major national east-west routes, Interstate 40 and U.S. Route 70. As of the 2020 United States census, Mount Juliet has a population of approximately 39,289 people. Mt. Juliet is the largest city in Wilson County. The official city charter has the name listed as Mt. Juliet; however, the United States Postal Service lists its name as Mount Juliet.

History

Mt. Juliet was formed in 1835 and incorporated as a city in 1972. The most widely accepted theory regarding the naming of the town is that it is named for the Mount Juliet Estate, a manor house in County Kilkenny, Ireland. It is the only U.S. city with this name.

In the early morning hours of March 3, 2020, Mt. Juliet was struck by an EF3 tornado that destroyed hundreds of homes, along with West Wilson Middle School and Stoner Creek Elementary. Five people were killed by the tornado, three of which were in Mt. Juliet.

Geography

Mt. Juliet is located at 36°12'10" North, 86°30'49" West (36.202654, -86.513583).

The total area is 1.99% water.

Mt. Juliet is located between Old Hickory Lake to its north and Percy Priest Lake to its south, both of which are man-made reservoirs.

Demographics

Mt. Juliet has claimed to be the "fastest-growing city in Tennessee," and it does qualify for this distinction considering growth from 2000 to 2015 for Tennessee cities with a population over 10,000. In recent years, Thompsons Station in Williamson County and Spring Hill in Williamson County have grown by a larger percentage.

2020 census

As of the 2020 United States census, there were 39,289 people, 11,969 households, and 9,412 families residing in the city.

2010 census 
As of the census of 2010, there were 23,671 people, 8,562 households, and 6,674 families residing in the city. The population density was 958.34 persons per square mile, and the housing unit density was 346.64 units per square mile. The racial makeup of the city was 86.92% White, 6.70% Black or African American, 2.47% Asian, 0.44% Native American, 0.05% Pacific Islander, 1.42% from other races, and 2.00% from two or more races. Those of Hispanic or Latino origins were 3.32% of the population.

Of the 8,562 households, 41.35% had children under the age of 18 living in them, 62.14% were married couples living together, 4.04% had a male householder with no wife present, 11.77% had a female householder with no husband present, and 22.05% were non-families. 17.96% of all households were made up of individuals, and 5.49% had someone living alone who was 65 years of age or older. The average household size was 2.75 and the average family size was 3.13.

In the city, the population was spread out, with 28.68% under the age of 18, 62.57% ages 18 to 64, and 8.75% ages 65 and over. The median age was 35.7 years. 52.00% of the population was female and 48.00% was male.

The median household income was $70,102, and the median family income was $76,585. Males had a median income of $52,841, versus $41,179 for females. The per capita income was $28,699. About 4.6% of families and 5.4% of the population were below the poverty line, including 6.6% of those under the age of 18 and 3.8% of those age 65 and over.

2000 census
As of the census of 2000, there were 12,366 people, 4,341 households, and 3,576 families residing in the city. The population density was 761.2 people per square mile (293.8/km2). There were 4,673 housing units at an average density of 287.6 per square mile (111.0/km2). The racial makeup of the city was 93.86% Caucasian, 3.93% African American, 0.39% Native American, 0.52% Asian, 0.01% Pacific Islander, 0.29% from other races, and 1.00% from two or more races. 1.17% of the population were Hispanic or Latino of any race.

There were 4,341 households, out of which 46.0% had children under the age of 18 living with them, 67.3% were married couples living together, 11.2% had a female householder with no husband present, and 17.6% were non-families. 13.8 percent of all households were made up of individuals, and 3.3% had someone living alone who was 65 years of age or older. The average household size was 2.82 and the average family size was 3.12.

In the city, the population was spread out, with 30.5% under the age of 18, 6.5% from 18 to 24, 35.3% from 25 to 44, 21.4% from 45 to 64, and 6.3% who were 65 years of age or older. The median age was 34 years. For every 100 females, there were 95.4 males. For every 100 females age 18 and over, there were 93.4 males.

In 2017, the median income household income was $80,130. The medium value of owner-occupied housing units is $238,700 and 7% of the population and 1.7% of families were below the poverty line. 3.2% of those under the age of 18 and 4.0% of those 65 and older were living below the poverty line. Wilson County is the 2nd wealthiest county in Tennessee.

Government and politics
Mt. Juliet operates on a "city manager-commission" system. It has five elected leaders: four commissioners elected by district and a mayor elected at-large. The mayor serves as chairperson of the city commission. All five officials serve four-year terms, and are officially part-time employees. The commission selects and appoints a city manager, who is employed full-time and runs the city's business on a day-to-day basis.

Mt. Juliet currently serves as the anchor city for Tennessee House of Representatives District 57 (Rep. Susan Lynn-R)and Tennessee Senate District 17. As of 2019, Mt. Juliet is in Tennessee's 6th congressional district.

Education
Mt. Juliet's public schools are operated by the Wilson County School District.

Elementary schools that serve Mt. Juliet include Mt. Juliet Elementary School, Elzie D. Patton Elementary School, W. A. Wright Elementary School, Lakeview Elementary School, and Rutland Elementary School (for sections south of Interstate 40). Middle schools that serve Mt. Juliet include Mt. Juliet Middle School, West Wilson Middle School, and Gladeville Middle School (for sections south of I-40). Most of Mt. Juliet is zoned to  Mt. Juliet High School. The northwestern portion of the city is zoned to Green Hill High School, while areas south of I-40 are zoned to Wilson Central High School.

Mount Juliet Christian Academy is in Mount Juliet.

Transportation
Interstate 40 and U.S. Route 70 (Lebanon Road) run east/west through Mt. Juliet, and State Route 171 (Mt Juliet Road) runs north-to-south connecting US-70 to I-40, before continuing toward Interstate 24 in the Antioch area. Interstate 40 has two exits in the city.

Mt. Juliet serves as a stop on the Music City Star commuter rail service from Nashville to Lebanon, operating over freight carrier Nashville and Eastern Railroad. The Music City star has stations in downtown Nashville, Donelson, Hermitage, Mt. Juliet, Martha (State Route 109), and Lebanon. The Music City Star also runs trains for Tennessee Titans games, New Year's Eve, Wilson County Fair, other events downtown Nashville.

City services
The City of Mt. Juliet operates a police department. Ambulance service are provided by WEMA (the Wilson Emergency Management Agency). The city has a combination career and volunteer Fire Department (MJFD) with one station on Belinda Parkway and another station located on Hill Street. MJFD is currently in the planning stages to build a third fire station on the north side of Mt. Juliet, next to the new Green Hill High School. In addition, Mt. Juliet has a police station near Charlie Daniels Park on the city's northwest side. In December 2008, the Mt. Juliet Police Department Animal Control Division opened a shelter on Industrial Drive. An additional 57 acres was recently added to enhance Mt. Juliet’s park system, as well as an 8 acre tract of land dedicated to youth soccer.
Youth sports are operated by private non profit organizations. Baseball and softball are run by Mt. Juliet League, Inc. Football and cheerleading are run by Mt. Juliet Youth Sports Association and basketball is run by the West Wilson Basketball Association.

Notable people
Muriel Bevis, athlete
Bjorn Bjorholm, bonsai artist
Levi Brown, professional football player
Amanda Butler, basketball coach
Alysha Clark, professional basketball player
Bobby Hamilton, NASCAR driver
Michael Jasper, professional football player
Greg Locke, Christian pastor
Chase Montgomery, NASCAR driver
Don Ray, professional basketball player
Dale Wainwright, Texas Supreme Court
Barry Wilmore, astronaut
Ross Winn, politician

Musicians
Adrian Belew
Owen Bradley
Charlie Daniels
Sid Harkreader
Chloe Kohanski
Erika Jo
Tracy Lawrence
Loretta Lynn
Collin Raye
Leon Russell
David P. Sartor
Leroy Van Dyke
Darryl Worley
Johnnie Wright
Caleb Followill
Jared Followill
Matthew Followill
Nathan Followill

References

External links
 Official website

1835 establishments in Tennessee
Cities in Tennessee
Cities in Wilson County, Tennessee
Cities in Nashville metropolitan area
Populated places established in 1835